The People's Palace or Palace of the People is the seat of the National Assembly and the Senate in Kinshasa, Democratic Republic of Congo, formerly Zaire.  It was completed in 1979 with a line of credit from the People's Republic of China.

Construction
The architecture was inspired by the Great Hall of the People designed by Zhang Bo (1911–1999) in Beijing. The site also includes the Kinshasa Martyrs' Stadium, contracted at the same time as the palace, a FIFA-class venue built by the Chinese in 1994.

Post-Zaire period

In June 1997, after the Alliance of Democratic Forces for the Liberation of Congo (AFDL) under Laurent Kabila seized power, the Parliament of the Republic left the Palace of the Nation to settle in the Palace of the People.

Laurent Kabila, president of the DRC, had overthrown United States' ally Mobutu, who died in exile in Morocco. After his assassination by a bodyguard in January 2001, Kabila lay in state at the People's Palace for three days before being interred.

In December 2013, famed African rumba musician Tabu Ley Rochereau, sometimes known as "the African Elvis", lay in state at the People's Palace.

On 19 January 2015, after appeals from opposition parties standing against Laurent's son and elected president Joseph Kabila's proposed plan to delay the scheduled 2016 elections until after a burdensome national census had been held, protesters gathered in front of the People's Palace.  They were subsequently attacked with tear gas and live ammunition by government security forces.  At least 42 people were killed in the violence.

See also 
 Parliament of the Democratic Republic of the Congo
 National Assembly of the Democratic Republic of Congo
 Senate of the Democratic Republic of the Congo

References

Buildings and structures in Kinshasa
Seats of national legislatures
Politics of the Democratic Republic of the Congo
Chinese aid to Africa
Government buildings completed in 1979
1979 establishments in Zaire